Bidens bipinnata is a common and widespread species of flowering plant in the family Asteraceae.

Distribution
Its native range remains uncertain due to its global distribution, however prevailing thought places its origin in Asia and North America. It is most commonly called by the common name Spanish needles.

Description

Bidens bipinnata is an annual herb up to 150 cm (60 inches) tall. It produces white or yellow flower heads each containing both disc florets and ray florets. The species grows in fields, forests, and disturbed sites such as road embankments and fallow agricultural areas.

References

External links

bipinnata
Flora of Asia
Flora of North America
Plants described in 1753
Taxa named by Carl Linnaeus